Asian Fever is the name of an adult magazine and companion adult video series published in the United States.

Overview
The magazine features explicit photos of naked young women. It features pictorials of East Asian women, interviews with Asian porn stars, and reviews of Asian pornography DVDs.

Asian Fever is published thirteen times per year by Larry Flynt's Larry Flynt Publications, and Hustler Video also produces an Asian Fever line of videos. Asian Fever writer David Aaron Clark became a director for the Asian Fever series with the twenty-fifth entry.

The first chapter of Butterfly: An Erotic Odyssey - Thailand, Cambodia, Philippines by Steven Yang first appeared in the magazine, with the book itself later being blurbed by Asian Fever.

Under the subheading "Me Love You Long Time" in the essay "White and Wong: Race, Porn, and the Word Wide Web" by Darrell Y. Hamamoto in Image Ethics in the Digital Age (edited by Larry P. Gross, John Stuart Katz, and Jay Ruby), it is noted that Hustler's Asian Fever was part of a "boomlet in skin magazines in the United States that cater to the Asiaphile," connected to the "White male fetishization of the Yellow female-object" (pages 250-251). "We Love You Long Time" happens to be the tagline on the first of the Asian Fever DVDs.

See also
 Asian Babes – UK magazine
 Asian fetish

References

External links
 Official website
 Hustler official website
 
 Asian Fever series at IAFD
 

Pornographic men's magazines
Men's magazines published in the United States
Monthly magazines published in the United States
Larry Flynt Publications
Magazines established in 1999
Ethnic pornography
Pornographic magazines published in the United States
1999 establishments in the United States